Éric Deschodt (born 30 March 1937) is a French journalist, writer and translator. He wrote police novels written in collaboration under the pseudonym Bernard-Paul Lallier.

Biography 
Éric Deschodt was Anne-Marie Deschodt's brother.

After graduating from high school and a bachelor's degree in philosophy, he became a journalist for Radio France, then worked in various fields: agricultural machinery salesman, painting representative, art publisher, fish farmer in Camargue. He eventually returned to journalism and worked successively for several publications, including Jours de France, Valeurs actuelles and Le Figaro.

In collaboration with Christian Charrière, and under the pseudonym Bernard-Paul Lallier, he published Le Saut de l'ange (1968), a detective novel that won that year's Prix du Quai des Orfèvres and was adapted under the eponymous title in cinema by Yves Boisset in 1971. This novel was followed by the sequel L'Ange du paradis, published in 1969. In 1977, Deschodt used the same pseudonym to write the thriller Terreur à Nantes in collaboration with Philippe Heduy.

Alone, Éric Deschodt published essays on French aviation and cigar making under his patronym, 10 or so novels, and biographies of Antoine de Saint-Exupéry, Octave Mirbeau, André Gide, Agrippa d'Aubigné, Gustave Eiffel and Attila. He also wrote translations, including Ceux de Falesa by Robert Louis Stevenson and Mickey Spillane's detective novels.

Work

Novels 
1977: Les Demoiselles sauvages, Paris, JC Lattès
1979: Le Général des galères, JC Lattès
1981: Les Îles captives, JC Lattès
1982: La Gloire au Liban, JC Lattès
1984: Le roi a fait battre tambour, JC Lattès
1985: Eugénie, les larmes aux yeux, JC Lattès
1988: Le Royaume d'Arles, JC Lattès
2000: Le Seul Amant, Paris, Éditions du Seuil
2003: Le Scorpion d'or, Paris, La Table Ronde
2004: Marguerite et les Enragés : meurtre à Florence, Seuil, (in collaboration with Jean-Claude Lattès)
2011: Iphigénie Vanderbilt, Paris, Robert Laffont
2013: Les Amants du grand monde, Paris, Éditions de Fallois

Detective novels signed Bernard-Paul Lallier 
1984: Le Saut de l'ange, Paris, Fayard
1969: L'Ange du paradis, Fayard
1977: Terreur à Nantes, Paris, Librairie des Champs-Élysées,  n°1489

Essays 
1977: La France envolée : l'aviation et la décadence 1906–1976, Paris, Société de production littéraire
1993: Histoire du Mont-de-Piété, Paris, Le Cherche-Midi
1996: L'ABCdaire du cigare, Paris, Flammarion, "Art de vivre"
1996: Le Cigare, Paris, Éditions du Regard
1996: D'un musée l'autre en Picardie, Éditions du Regard
2002: So British: Old England, Paris, Éditions du Regard
2005: Château Lagrézette, Éditions du Regard, (in collaboration with Alain-Dominique Perrin)
2009: Lafite Rothschild, Éditions du Regard

Biographies 
1980: Saint-Exupéry, Jean-Claude Lattès
1989: Mirbeau, roman d'une terre de France, Jean-Claude Lattès
1991: Gide : le « contemporain capital », Paris, Perrin
1994: L'Orgueil du guerrier : Claude Barrès, Perrin
1995: Agrippa d'Aubigné : le guerrier inspiré, Paris, Robert Laffont
2002: Gustave Eiffel : un illustre inconnu, Paris, Pygmalion
2006: Attila, Paris, Gallimard, Folio. Biographies n°13
2014: Pour Clemenceau, Paris, Éditions de Fallois

Prizes 
 1968: Prix du Quai des Orfèvres for Le Saut de l'ange, novel signed under the pseudonym Bernard-Paul Lallier
 1981: Prix Roland de Jouvenel for Saint-Exupéry
 1984: Prix Roland de Jouvenel for Le roi a fait battre tambour
 1986: Prix des Deux Magots for Eugénie les larmes aux yeux
 1996: Prix de la biuographie for Agrippa d'Aubigné, le guerrier inspiré

Cinematographic adaptation 
 1971: , French film by Yves Boisset, with Jean Yanne, Senta Berger and Sterling Hayden

Sources 

References

External links 
 Éric Deschodt on the site of the Académie française
 Penjab, Éric Deschodt on La Cause Littéraire
 Biographie et bibliographie sur Babelio
 Eric Deschodt on YouTube

1937 births
20th-century French novelists
21st-century French novelists
French translators
English–French translators
French crime fiction writers
20th-century French essayists
21st-century French essayists
French biographers
Prix des Deux Magots winners
20th-century French journalists
Living people